Halterner Mühlenbach (in its upper course: Heubach) is a river of North Rhine-Westphalia, Germany.

Its upper course is the Heubach, which splits up into the Umflut and the river now called Halterner Mühlenbach. The Umflut later reunites with the Halterner Mühlenbach. It then flows into the reservoir  which dams both the Halterner Mühlenbach and the Stever, thus it is a right tributary of the Stever.

See also
List of rivers of North Rhine-Westphalia

References

Rivers of North Rhine-Westphalia
Rivers of Germany